The Superstock TT is a motorcycle road race that takes place during the Isle of Man TT festival. The event for production based motor-cycles racing on treaded road tyres is based on the FIM Superstock 1000 Championship specifications.

Engine capacity
The Production TT, racing for production based motor-cycles had been part of the Isle of Man TT Races since 1967 for 250cc, 500cc & 750cc classes replacing the Lightweight, Junior and Senior production motor-cycles of the Clubmans TT races (1947 – 1956).  These production based machines raced until the 1976 Isle of Man TT until the classes were discontinued.  The Production TT was reintroduced for the 1984 Isle of Man TT Races for 3 class classes, reduced to two classes on safety grounds for the 1990 races.  For the 2005 Isle of Man TT the Superstock TT race replaced the previous 1000cc & 600cc Production TT classes that had been part of the Isle of Man TT race schedule since 1989.

Eligibility

Entrants
 Entrants must be in possession of a valid National Entrants or FIM Sponsors Licence for Road Racing.

Machines
The 2012 specification for entries into the Superstock TT race are defined as;-
 Any machine complying with the following specifications:
 Superstock TT: (Machines complying with the 2012 FIM Superstock Championships specifications)
 Over 600cc up to 1000cc 4 cylinders 4-stroke
 Over 750cc up to 1000cc 3 cylinders 4-stroke
 Over 850cc up to 1200cc 2 cylinders 4-stroke

Official Qualification Time
 115% of the time set by the third fastest qualifier in the class.

Speed and Lap Records
The lap record for the Superstock TT is a time of 16 minutes and 50.601 seconds, at an average speed of  set by Peter Hickman on lap 4 of the 2018 Superstock TT.

Superstock TT Race Winners

References

See also
TT Zero
Lightweight TT
Ultra-Lightweight TT
Sidecar TT
Junior TT
Senior TT